The siege of Calais of 1596, also known as the Spanish conquest of Calais, took place at the strategic port-city of Calais (present-day Nord-Pas-de-Calais, France), between 8 and 24 April 1596, as part of the Franco-Spanish War (1595–1598), in the context of the French Wars of Religion, the Anglo-Spanish War (1585–1604), and the Eighty Years' War. The siege ended when the city fell into Spanish hands after a short and intense siege by the Spanish Army of Flanders commanded by Archduke Albert of Austria, Governor-General of the Spanish Netherlands  (Spanish: Alberto de Austria). The French troops in the citadel of Calais resisted for a few days more but finally, on 24 April, the Spanish troops led by Don Luis de Velasco y Velasco, Count of Salazar, assaulted and captured the fortress, achieving a complete victory. The Spanish success was the first action of the campaign of Archduke Albert of 1596.

Background

Since 1562, France had been in the grip of the French Wars of Religion in which Spain had regularly intervened in favour of the Catholic League of France, most notably in the siege of Paris (in 1590) or the Rouen (in 1591), and other battles as Craon in 1592, or the Relief of Blaye in 1593. But only in 1595, the war was officially declared between the two countries by the new King Henry IV of France (French: Henri de Bourbon), who had the year before converted to Catholicism and been received into Paris to be crowned.

Henry IV was attempting to reconquer large parts of northern France from hostile Spanish-French Catholic forces. In 1595, the Spanish army led by Don Pedro Henríquez de Acevedo, Count of Fuentes, took the initiative, conquering a great number of French towns, castles, and villages, including Doullens. In the spring of 1596, the French army led by Henry IV laid siege to La Fère, under control of the Catholic League of France.

After the death at Brussels of the Archduke Ernest of Austria, on 20 February 1595, the Archduke Albert was sent by Philip II of Spain (Spanish: Felipe II de España) to Brussels from the Spanish court in Madrid, to succeed his elder brother as Governor-General of the Spanish Netherlands, charge assigned to Don Pedro Henríquez de Acevedo, Count of Fuentes, until the arrival of Albert to the Low Countries. He made his entry in Brussels on 11 February 1596, and his priority was the conflict with Henry IV of France. On 29 March, Albert left Brussels, and went to Valenciennes, where met the forces of the Spanish Army of Flanders, and advanced over France in late March, but instead of sending it to relieve La Fère, it turned towards Calais, where it arrived on 8 April.

Siege of Calais

Port-city of Calais

The French troops at Calais were taken completely by surprise by the Spanish forces led by Archduke Albert. Henry was on the point of capturing the town of La Fère, in Picardy, from the Catholic League of France and their Spanish allies after a long and costly siege, and couldn't spare any troops to relieve Calais, and his English and Dutch allies reacted too slowly. Queen Elizabeth of England proposed sending her favourite commander at that time, Sir Robert Devereux, Earl of Essex, with 6,000 to 8,000 soldiers to support the French defenders in Calais, but Elizabeth demanded of Henry that Calais should return to English rule after her intervention. However, while the two monarchs bickered, the work of Spanish troops was crucial, which made it impossible for the English to help. Moreover, Maurice of Nassau, Prince of Orange, on hearing the news, hurried to Zeeland to prepare a relief army and a fleet to relieve Calais, but the city fell the day that the first Dutch ships were preparing to sail.

Relief forces

The city fell to the Spaniards after ten days of siege, after which only the citadel remained in French hands. The French general François d'Orléans-Longueville, Duke of Fronsac and Château-Thierry, tried to break the siege by sea, and help the city with supplies and fresh troops, but was successfully stopped by the bombardments of the Spanish artillery. Finally Henry IV, knowing the importance of losing one of the most important port cities of France (on 3 August 1347, Calais was conquered by Edward III of England during the Hundred Years' War, becoming a strong English bastion in France, and was under English rule until the French army commanded by Francis, Duke of Guise, reconquered the city on January 8, 1558, and turned to French sovereignty, during the Last Italian War), also tried to relieve the city, and with a great part of his troops, Henry set out to march towards Calais.

Citadel of Calais
On Wednesday 24 April the Spanish troops led by Don Luis de Velasco stormed the citadel. All fought with great courage but the French forces could not match the skill and experience of the professional Spanish and Walloon assault force. The French lost thousands of men in the assault, and a great part were taken prisoners. The Spanish lost around 200 dead and wounded. The Governor of Calais, Seigneur de Widessan, and some of his captains, were executed. Into the citadel, the Spaniards took a valuable treasure, composed, among other things, of a large amount of gold and silver coins, horses, and a great quantity of gunpowder and supplies. With the capture of the citadel the whole city was under Spanish control, and the hopes of Henry IV to retain the city under his control vanished.

The capture of the citadel of Calais was the first military action of the collecting cartons of the Flemish artist Jan Snellinck, designed for a series of tapestries known as The battles of Archduke Albert, now owned by Patrimonio Nacional.

Consequences

The conquest of the city by the Spanish Army of Flanders, led by Archduke Albert, was a resounding victory, and a severe blow to Henry IV of France, and his Protestant allies. Calais was of strategic importance, for it gave Spain an excellent port to control the English Channel, along with Dunkirk. Having left behind a strong garrison, Albert advanced with the army to the nearby stronghold of Ardres. 

The French defenders offered stiff resistance, but on 23 May were forced to surrender to the clear superiority of the Spanish forces. The day before the Spanish capture of Ardres, La Fère finally fell to Henry IV's troops, after an honorable surrender of the Franco-Spanish-Catholic troops commanded by Don Álvaro de Osorio. The next target of Albert was Hulst, in toe Dutch front. In the middle of July, the assault on the town was launched, and little more than a month later, Hulst capitulated to the Spaniards, despite the efforts of Prince Maurice of Nassau to relieve the city.

Calais was under Spanish control for two years, when it was ceded by Spain to French control after the Peace of Vervins in 1598.

See also
 Siege of Calais (1558)
 Siege of Doullens
 Battle of the Lippe
 List of Governors of the Spanish Netherlands

Notes

References
 Wagner, John A./Walters, Susan. Encyclopedia of Tudor England. Library of Congress Cataloging-in-Publication Data. 
 Thomas P. Campbell/Pascal-François Bertrand/Jeri Bapasola. Tapestry in the Baroque: Threads of Splendor. The Metropolitan Museum of Art. 2008.
 Whittemore, Hank. The Monument: By Edward de Vere, 17th Earl of Oxford. London. 1609.
 Knecht, Robert J. (1996). The French Wars of Religion 1559–1598. Seminar Studies in History (2nd ed.). New York: Longman. 
 Arnold-Baker, Charles. The Companion to British History. First published 1996. 
 Horne, Alistair. Seven Ages of Paris: Portrait of a City. (2003) Pan Books.
 Demarsy, Arthur. La prise de Doullens par les Espagnols en 1595. Paris. 1867. 
 Giménez Martín, Juan. Tercios de Flandes. Ediciones Falcata Ibérica. First edition 1999, Madrid.  
 John H. Elliott (2001). Europa en la época de Felipe II, 1559-1598. Barcelona: Editorial Crítica.   
 Luc Duerloo. Dynasty and Piety: Archduke Albert (1598-1621) and Habsburg Political Culture in an Age of Religious Wars. MPG Books Group. UK. 
 Thomas M McCoog, S.J. The Society of Jesus in Ireland, Scotland, and England, 1589-1597. Printed in Great Britain. MPG Books Group.

External links
 Siege of Calais by Rutger Velpius
 The Eighty Years War (1568-1648)
 Luis de Velasco y Velasco, 2nd Count of Salazar 
 Leids Heelal: Het Loterijspel (1596) by Jan Van Hout 

Conflicts in 1596
Calais 1596
Calais 1596
Calais 1596
Calais 1596
1596 in France
History of Calais